The Evangelical Church of Gabon belongs to the Reformed family of churches. It was created by American missionaries, the American Board of Foreign Missions worked in Gabon between 1842 to 1870. The Board of Foreign Mission of the Presbyterian Church (USA)  worked from 1870 to 1913. The Paris Mission Society took over the mission till 1961, when the Evangelical Church of Gabon become independent. The church underwent several splits, and the denomination had hard times in the 1970s.

In 1997 the Synod was formed. In April 2005 several dissenting groups reunified. From this time the united denomination extended its activities to south Gabon.

The church accepts the La Rochelle Confession of Faith, it has 108 congregations and 20,000 members. Since 2004 women are accepted to the ministry. It is a member of the World Council of Churches. and the Fellowship of Christian Councils and Churches of Central Africa.

References 

Reformed denominations in Africa
1997 establishments in Gabon